Ikko Nakatsuka (born 4 April 1965) is a Japanese politician, member of Democratic Party of Japan and former minister of state.

Early life and education
Nakatsuka was born in Kyoto Prefecture on 4 April 1965. He graduated with an engineering degree from Kyoto University in March 1990.

Career
Nakatsuka began his political career in the now-disestablished Shinshinto (New Frontier Party). Next, he served as a policy staffer of the defunct Liberal Party established by Ichiro Ozawa. He later joined the Democratic Party of Japan in 2003. He has been serving as the party's vice secretary general and deputy policy chief since then.

He served three times in the Japanese House of Representatives. He was first elected in 2000. In 2003, he was secondly elected to the house and appointed vice minister of economic and fiscal policy, finance. In 2009, he was again elected. In September 2011, he became senior vice minister of cabinet affairs. He served as senior vice Minister of State for Financial Services  issues at the Cabinet Office until October 2012. Nakatsuta was appointed Minister of State for Financial Services  in the Noda Cabinet on 1 October 2012. His term ended on 26 December 2012. Nakatsuka also lost his seat in the 2012 general elections.

Personal life
Nakatsuta is married and has two children. He was lead singer in a band and participated in volunteer work during his university years.

References

21st-century Japanese politicians
1965 births
Democratic Party of Japan politicians
Government ministers of Japan
20th-century Japanese engineers
Kyoto University alumni
Living people
Members of the House of Representatives (Japan)
Noda cabinet
People from Kyoto Prefecture
21st-century Japanese engineers